is a private university in Takasaki, Gunma, Japan, established in 2005. The predecessor of the school was founded in 1998.

External links
 Official website 

Educational institutions established in 1998
Private universities and colleges in Japan
Universities and colleges in Gunma Prefecture
1998 establishments in Japan
Takasaki, Gunma